The Women's sprint competition at the FIS Nordic World Ski Championships 2021 was held on 25 February 2021.

Results

Qualification
The qualification was held at 09:00.

Quarterfinals
The top two of each heat and the two best-timed skiers advanced to the semifinals.

Quarterfinal 1

Quarterfinal 2

Quarterfinal 3

Quarterfinal 4

Quarterfinal 5

Semifinals
The top two of each heat and the two best-timed skiers advanced to the final.

Semifinal 1

Semifinal 2

Final

References

Women's sprint